Jacó is a district of the Garabito canton, in the Puntarenas province of Costa Rica.

History 
Jacó was created on 16 September 1965. Segregated from Puntarenas.

Geography 

Jacó has an area of  km² and an elevation of  metres.

Jacó lies between several mountains, and is neighbored by the beaches of Herradura Bay to the North, and Playa Hermosa to the South (not to be confused with another beach by the same name, but located in Guanacaste). About 35 kilometers north of Jacó, lies the Carara National Park, recognized for its exuberant wildlife and dense rain forest. Carara is home to one of the largest remaining populations of wild scarlet macaws in the country. The Manuel Antonio National Park is located 75 kilometres south of Jacó.

Jacó lies about 100 kilometers (a little less than two hours via Route 34) from the capital San José and an hour and a half from Costa Rica's primary international airport, Juan Santamaría International, accessed via Route 27 and Route 34.

Climate
As Jacó lies on the seashore, climate is normally humid, with relative humidity around 80%, reaching 90% in June. During the dry season, away from the water, the temperature may consistently reach  or above.

Jacó lies in a tropical climate zone mainly defined by distinct dry and wet seasons.  Generally speaking, August through early December are wet, and late December through early April are dry; the remaining months have irregular rainy spells.

Demographics 

For the 2011 census, Jacó had a population of  inhabitants.

Transportation

Road transportation 
The district is covered by the following road routes:
 National Route 34

Economy

Tourism
The beach in Jacó hosts several surfing schools and various shops that sell and rent equipment for surfing. Jacó is also near beaches for more professional surfers, such as Hermosa Beach, which is just five minutes away, with pipes and beach break for experienced surfers only.

Jacó is not only known for its beaches and nightlife, but is near several national parks. Manuel Antonio National Park is only about an hour to the south. There are several excursions available in Jacó, such as ATV and horseback riding tours, snorkeling cruise to Tortuga Island, hiking, and ziplining.

References

External links

Surfing
Districts of Puntarenas Province
Populated places in Puntarenas Province